Bashar Al-Najjar (born 1 November 1991) is a Jordanian karateka. He won the gold medal in the men's kumite 67 kg event at the 2017 Islamic Solidarity Games held in Baku, Azerbaijan. He is also a gold medalist at the Asian Karate Championships and a two-time medalist at the Asian Games.

Career 

In 2010, he won the silver medal in the men's kumite 60 kg event at the Asian Games held in Guangzhou, China. Four years later, he lost his bronze medal match in the men's kumite 67 kg event at the 2014 Asian Games in Incheon, South Korea. In 2018, he won one of the bronze medals in the men's kumite 75 kg event at the Asian Games held in Jakarta, Indonesia.

In 2021, he competed at the World Olympic Qualification Tournament held in Paris, France hoping to qualify for the 2020 Summer Olympics in Tokyo, Japan.

Achievements

References 

Living people
1991 births
Place of birth missing (living people)
Jordanian male karateka
Karateka at the 2010 Asian Games
Karateka at the 2014 Asian Games
Karateka at the 2018 Asian Games
Medalists at the 2010 Asian Games
Medalists at the 2018 Asian Games
Asian Games medalists in karate
Asian Games silver medalists for Jordan
Asian Games bronze medalists for Jordan
Islamic Solidarity Games medalists in karate
Islamic Solidarity Games competitors for Jordan
21st-century Jordanian people